5'll Getcha Ten is the second studio album by American rock band Cowboy. Produced by Johnny Sandlin, the album was released in October 1971 by Capricorn Records. Cowboy formed in 1969 by songwriters  Tommy Talton and Scott Boyer. The group was signed to Macon, Georgia-based Capricorn Records by the suggestion of Duane Allman, guitarist and leader of the Allman Brothers Band. Cowboy's first album, Reach for the Sky, was released in 1970, and they supported the Allman Brothers on a national tour between 1970–71. 5'll Getcha Ten was recorded at both Capricorn's studio in Macon and Muscle Shoals Sound Studios in Sheffield, Alabama, as the former was still under construction at the time.

Background
5'll Getcha Ten was released in October 1971. Songwriter and co-founder Talton remembered that while the LP carried the carefree nature of its predecessor, it reflected a maturation in their musicianship, honed while on the road touring. "There was a sense that this is our job now [...] Suddenly we owed money to our record company," he recalled. The group had double the songs necessary for recording a new album, as they were frequently writing. "All My Friends" was inspired by the numerous friends who would stop by the band's rural farmhouse in Macon where they often resided. And Gregg Allman later covered the song on his “Laid Back” album in 1973. "The Wonder"—a staunch anti-war anthem—was written by John McKenze, who was a friend of the band from their beginnings in Florida. Much of Talton's lyricism comes from a spiritual place, though he has said it held no basis in organized religion. In a later reissue for the album's liner notes, he explains that the song "5'll Getcha Ten" was penned after experiencing a turbulent ride through a storm while on the way to a performance in Atlanta. "It's just my little personal observation about how sometimes we don't pay attention to the magnitude of it all," he said.

"Please Be with Me"—perhaps the band’s best-known song—was written by Boyer in just fifteen minutes in a hotel room late in the recording process. Duane Allman plays dobro on the song. An additional take of the song was later added to Duane Allman: An Anthology (1972), a compilation spanning his career after his death in a motorcycle crash the year prior. Eric Clapton later covered the song as well on his 1974 album 461 Ocean Boulevard.

Critical reception
A reviewer for Billboard praised the "excellent guitar work" present on the LP, commenting, "the songs have a country feeling, but are soft rock in nature." James Chrispell of AllMusic gave the album 4.5 out of 5 stars, writing, "Full of laid-back Southern charm, 5'll Getcha Ten finds Cowboy further exploring the wonders of back-porch music. Strong songwriting and beautiful harmonies abound here."

Track listing

Personnel
Adapted from 5'll Getcha Ten liner notes.

Cowboy
Scott Boyer – acoustic guitar, electric guitar, violin, lead vocals
Tommy Talton – acoustic guitar, lead guitar, lead vocals
Bill Pillmore – piano, acoustic guitar, fiddle, vocals
George Clark – bass guitar, vocals
Pete Kowalke – acoustic guitar, lead guitar, vocals, drums
Tom Wynn – drums, percussion

Additional musicians
 Chuck Leavell — piano
 Duane Allman — dobro (on "Please Be with Me"), electric guitar (on "Lookin' for You")

Production and artwork
Johnny Sandlin – production, recording engineer, remixing
Steve Smith – recording engineer
George Marino – mastering engineer
Frank Fenter – executive supervision
B.T. Brandhorst – artwork
Jimm Roberts – photography

Notes

References

External links

5'll Getcha Ten at YouTube (streamed copy where licensed)

Capricorn Records albums
1971 albums